Nandito Ako Nagmamahal Sa'Yo is a 2009 Philippine romantic-drama film, starring Aljur Abrenica and Kris Bernal. It was directed by Maryo J. de los Reyes under Regal Entertainment.

Plot summary
Tata (Aljur Abrenica) believes that Bohol is the ultimate paradise of hope for his slum dog life in Quiapo. When his ailing mother suddenly wished for them to transfer to Bohol, Tata's life underwent a major turning point. Upon his arrival, Tata will be shocked to find out that his biological father is still alive and that he has a stepbrother named Prince (Baron Geisler). Much to his surprise, Tata was immediately accepted by his new family and found a new life with them. As Tata begins his new life in Bohol, he will also discover the true love that he has been long waiting for in the personification of Stephanie (Kris Bernal), a rich and lovely lass. But when he finds out that Stephanie is the soon to be bride of Prince, Tata will have to toughly choose between family and his destiny.

Cast

Main cast
Aljur Abrenica as Lorenzo "Tata" Lugod
Kris Bernal as Stephanie  "Steph" Lozano

Supporting cast
Baron Geisler as Prince Suganob
Valeen Montenegro as Rubylyn Alba
Ana Capri as Aida Lugod
Lloyd Samartino as Orly Suganob
Julio Diaz as Eddie Lozano
Carlo Aquino as Makoy Flores
Gerald Madrid as Fr. Manny Lozano
Anton Bernardo as Rosauro Alimentado
Lailette Boiser as Gemma Alimentado
Disi Alba as Cheng Lozano
Say Alonzo as Kyla
Cathy Remperas as Jane 
Dean Pastrano as Roy

References

External links
 

2000s Tagalog-language films
2009 films
Philippine romantic drama films
Regal Entertainment films
2000s English-language films
Films directed by Maryo J. de los Reyes